Yush (also Romanized as Yūsh and Yoosh; also known as Yūshu) is a village in Jolgeh-e Mazhan Rural District, Jolgeh-e Mazhan District, Khusf County, South Khorasan Province, Iran. At the 2006 census, its population was 44, in 12 families.

References 

Populated places in Khusf County